Events in the year 1579 in Norway.

Incumbents
Monarch: Frederick II

Events

Arts and literature
 Christen Mule erects a Renaissance building on the ruins of the previous bishop's palace in Oslo.

Births
3 June - Jens Munk, polar explorer (died 1628).

Deaths

See also

References